Ro-66 was an Imperial Japanese Navy Type L submarine of the L4 subclass. First commissioned in 1927, she served in the waters of Japan prior to World War II. During World War II, she operated in the Central Pacific and supported Japanese forces in the Battle of Wake Island until she sank after a collision in December 1941.

Design and description
The submarines of the Type L4 sub-class were copies of the Group 3 subclass of the British L-class submarine built under license in Japan. They were slightly larger and had two more torpedo tubes than the preceding submarines of the L3 subclass. They displaced  surfaced and  submerged.

For surface running, the submarines were powered by two  Vickers diesel engines, each driving one propeller shaft. When submerged, each propeller was driven by an  electric motor. They could reach  on the surface and  underwater.

The submarines were armed with six internal  torpedo tubes, all in the bow, and carried a total of twelve 6th Year Type torpedoes. They were also armed with a single  deck gun and a 6.5 mm machine gun.

Construction and commissioning

Ro-66 was laid down on 1 December 1925 by Mitsubishi at Kobe, Japan. Launched on 25 October 1926, she was completed and commissioned on 28 July 1927.

Service history

Pre-World War II

Upon commissioning, Ro-66 was attached to the Sasebo Naval District and assigned to Submarine Division 27 — in which she spent her entire career — in Submarine Squadron 1 in the 1st Fleet in the Combined Fleet. Submarine Division 27 was reassigned to the Sasebo Defense Division in the Sasebo Naval District on 30 November 1929. On 24 December 1929, the division was reassigned to Submarine Squadron 2 in the 2nd Fleet in the Combined Fleet. Ro-66 was decommissioned and placed in reserve at Sasebo, Japan, on 15 November 1930.

Ro-66 was recommissioned on 1 May 1931, resuming active service in Submarine Division 27, which by then had been reassigned to the Sasebo Defense Division in the Sasebo Naval District. On 1 October 1932, the division was reassigned to the Sasebo Guard Squadron. On 15 November 1933, the division returned to service in the Sasebo Defense Division, and that day Ro-66 again was decommissioned and placed in reserve at Sasebo.

Ro-66 was recommissioned on 15 November 1934, and returned to service in Submarine Division 27 which by then again was serving in the Sasebo Guard Squadron in the Sasebo Naval District. The division was transferred to the Sasebo Defense Squadron on 15 November 1935.

Sources offer different accounts of Ro-66′s status during 1938–1940, implying both that she was in full commission throughout those years and stating that she was out of commission and in reserve — in Second Reserve from 15 December 1938 to 15 November 1939 and then in First Reserve until 15 November 1940 — in the Sasebo Naval District between December 1938 and November 1940. Whatever the case, she was back in active service in time for Submarine Division 27′s reassignment to Submarine Squadron 7 in the 4th Fleet in the Combined Fleet on 15 November 1940.

She received the message "Climb Mount Niitaka 1208" from the Combined Fleet on 2 December 1941, indicating that war with the Allies would commence on 8 December 1941 Japan time, which was on 7 December 1941 on the other side of the International Date Line in Hawaii, where Japanese plans called for the war to open with their attack on Pearl Harbor.

World War II

Battle of Wake Island
On 6 December 1941, Ro-66 got underway from Kwajalein with the commander of Submarine Squadron 27 embarked to conduct a reconnaissance of Wake Island, which the Japanese planned to invade on 8 December 1941, the first day of the war on Wake Island′s side of the International Date Line. The Battle of Wake Island began on 8 December 1941, with Ro-65, Ro-66, and Ro-67 patrolling in the area supporting Japanese forces attempting to seize the atoll. United States Marine Corps forces defending Wake drove back the initial Japanese assault that day.

While the Japanese gathered reinforcements for a second and larger invasion of the island, Submarine Squadron 7 sent orders to all three submarines of Submarine Division 27 on 12 December 1941 directing them to return to Kwajalein. Accordingly, Ro-65 and Ro-67 headed back to Kwajalein, but a radio failure prevented Ro-66 from receiving the orders despite three attempts by Submarine Squadron 7 to contact her. Consequently, she continued to patrol off Wake Island as the submarines of Submarine Division 26 — , ,and  — arrived in the area to relieve the departing submarines.

Loss

Both submarines attempted to back off, but it was too late to avoid a collision, and Ro-62 rammed Ro-66 at 20:20 Japan Standard Time. Ro-62 rescued her three survivors, who had been thrown overboard from her bridge by the collision.

The Battle of Wake Island concluded on 23 December 1941 with the Japanese conquest of the atoll. The Japanese struck Ro-66 from the Navy list on 15 January 1942.

References

Bibliography
, History of Pacific War Extra, "Perfect guide, The submarines of the Imperial Japanese Forces", Gakken (Japan), March 2005, 
The Maru Special, Japanese Naval Vessels No.43 Japanese Submarines III, Ushio Shobō (Japan), September 1980, Book code 68343-44
The Maru Special, Japanese Naval Vessels No.132 Japanese Submarines I "Revised edition", Ushio Shobō (Japan), February 1988, Book code 68344-36
The Maru Special, Japanese Naval Vessels No.133 Japanese Submarines II "Revised edition", Ushio Shobō (Japan), March 1988, Book code 68344-37

External links
 Photo of Ro-66 at combinedfleet.com

Ro-60-class submarines
Japanese L type submarines
Ships built by Mitsubishi Heavy Industries
1926 ships
World War II submarines of Japan
Maritime incidents in November 1942
Japanese submarine accidents
Submarines sunk in collisions
Japanese submarines lost during World War II
World War II shipwrecks in the Pacific Ocean